SGR 0525−66 (also known as PSR B0525−66) is a soft gamma repeater (SGR), located in the Super-Nova Remnant (SNR) 0525−66.1, otherwise known as N49, in the Large Magellanic Cloud. It was the first soft gamma repeater discovered, and as of 2015, the only known located outside our galaxy. First detected in March 1979, it was located by using the measurement of the arrival time differences of the signal by the set of artificial satellites equipped with gamma ray detectors. The association with N49 can only be indirect: it seems clear that soft gamma repeaters form in young stellar clusters.  It is not certain that the explosion that gave birth to SGR 0525-66 is also the one that produced the remnant N49.

Discovery
On March 5, 1979, two Soviet spacecraft that were then drifting through the Solar System were hit by a blast of gamma radiation at 15:51 UTC. This contact raised the radiation readings on both the probes from a normal 100 counts per second to over 200,000 counts a second, in only a fraction of a millisecond.

This burst of gamma rays quickly continued to spread. Eleven seconds later, Helios 2, a NASA probe, which was in orbit around the Sun, was saturated by the blast of radiation. It soon hit Venus, and the Pioneer Venus Orbiter's detectors were overcome by the wave. Seconds later, Earth received the wave of radiation, where the powerful output of gamma rays inundated the detectors of three U.S. Department of Defense Vela satellites, the Soviet Prognoz 7 satellite, and the Einstein Observatory. Just before the wave exited the Solar System, the blast also hit the International Sun–Earth Explorer. This extremely powerful blast of gamma radiation constituted the strongest wave of extra-solar gamma rays ever detected; it was over 100 times more intense than any known previous extra-solar burst. Because gamma rays travel at the speed of light and the time of the pulse was recorded by several distant spacecraft as well as on Earth, the source of the gamma radiation could be calculated to an accuracy of about 2 arcseconds. The direction of the source corresponded with the remnants of a star that had gone supernova around 3000 B.C.E. The source was named SGR 0525-66, the event itself was named GRB 790305b, the first observed SGR megaflare.

See also
 GRB 790305b
 LMC N49

References

External links
 
 

Stars in the Large Magellanic Cloud
Extragalactic stars
Large Magellanic Cloud
Dorado (constellation)
Soft gamma repeaters
 Magnetars